= Karamah, Hama =

Al karama, Hama الكرامة
- neighborhood
- Country: Syria
- Governorate: Hama
- District: Hama Governorate
- Subdistrict: Al Bernawy

Population (2004)
  - Total: 218
- Time zone: UTC+3 (AST)
- City Qrya Pcode: N/A

Alkaramah neighborhood, Hama (Arabic: الكرامة) is a Syrian neighborhood located in Hama city in the north-west of Hama, Hama. According to the Syria Central Bureau of Statistics (CBS), Alkaramah neighborhood had a population of 218 in the 2004 census.
